Pseudhipparion is an extinct genus of three-toed horse endemic to North America during the Miocene. They were herding animals whose diet consisted of C3 plants. Fossils found in Georgia and Florida indicate that it was a lightweight horse, weighing up to 90 pounds (40 kilograms). In 2005, fossils were unearthed in Oklahoma. Seven species of Pseudhipparion are known from the fossil record which were very small, following the trend of Bergmann's rule.

References

Miocene horses
Miocene odd-toed ungulates
Prehistoric placental genera
Miocene mammals of North America
Barstovian
Clarendonian
Hemphillian
Fossil taxa described in 1904
Taxa named by Florentino Ameghino